Lipoma-preferred partner is a protein that in humans is encoded by the LPP gene.

Function 

Lipoma-preferred partner is a subfamily of LIM domain proteins that are characterized by an N-terminal proline rich region and three C-terminal LIM domains. The encoded protein localizes to the cell periphery in focal adhesions and may be involved in cell-cell adhesion and cell motility. This protein also shuttles through the nucleus and may function as a transcriptional co-activator. This gene is located at the junction of certain disease related chromosomal translocations which result in the expression of fusion proteins that may promote tumor growth.

References

Further reading